Rautatie is the thirty-fourth album by Finnish experimental rock band Circle.

It was issued in 2010 by Ektro Records and continues Circle's exploration of classic heavy metal whilst retaining their obsession with krautrock-style repetition. It was re-released in 2011 as a vinyl edition by Svart/Full Contact.

Track listing
 Rautatie (4:57)
 Lääke (3:54)
 Vaellus (7:58)
 Kohtalon sormi (7:17)
 Tähet (3:17)
 Pelkkä meno (5:30)
 Lautatarha (5:57)
 Kaasukello (8:18)

Personnel

Jussi Lehtisalo
Tomi Leppänen
Mika Rättö
Janne Westerlund
Julius Jääskeläinen
Pekka Jääskeläinen

Circle (band) albums
2010 albums